Noel Coonan (born 6 January 1951) is a former Irish Fine Gael politician who served as a Teachta Dála (TD) for the Tipperary North constituency from 2007 to 2016. He was a Senator for the Cultural and Educational Panel from 2002 to 2007.

He was elected at the 2007 general election to Dáil Éireann as a Fine Gael TD for Tipperary North. He had been a member of the 22nd Seanad Éireann in 2002 as a Senator for the Cultural and Educational Panel.

A former member of North Tipperary County Council and Templemore Town Council, he was an unsuccessful candidate for Dáil Éireann in the Tipperary North constituency at the 2002 general election.

He was the Fine Gael deputy Spokesperson on Agriculture, Fisheries and Food, with special responsibility for Common Agricultural Policy reform from October 2010 to March 2011. He had been deputy Spokesperson on Communications, Energy and Natural Resources, with special responsibility for Telecommunications from 2007 to 2010. He is President of the Collins 22 Society.

He lost his seat at the 2016 general election, and was an unsuccessful candidate for election to the Seanad in April 2016.

He contested the May 2019 local elections in Tipperary, and won a seat in the Thurles-Templemore local election area.  In June 2020, he was elected to the Chair of the Thurles-Templemore District Council.

References

 

1951 births
Living people
Fine Gael TDs
Local councillors in North Tipperary
Members of the 22nd Seanad
Members of the 30th Dáil
Members of the 31st Dáil
Politicians from County Tipperary
Fine Gael senators
People from Cahir